The name Jangmi has been used to name four tropical cyclones in the northwestern Pacific Ocean. In addition, the variant Changmi was used in 2002 before the spelling was corrected by the WMO Typhoon Committee, The name was contributed by Korea; it means a rose.
 Tropical Storm Changmi (2002) (T0219) – wasn't recognized by the JTWC.
 Typhoon Jangmi (2008) (T0815, 19W, Ofel) – made landfall in Nan'ao, Yilan, Taiwan.
 Tropical Storm Jangmi (2014) (T1423, 23W, Seniang) – struck the Philippines, causing the deaths of 66 people and ₱1.27 billion in damages.
 Tropical Storm Jangmi (2020) (T2005, 05W, Enteng) – affected South Korea.

Pacific typhoon set index articles